Sauda Kauma is Uganda politician and a representative member of parliament for Iganga District in the eleventh parliament of Uganda. She is affiliated to the National Resistance Movement

Political career 
Sauda sits on the Committee on Rules, Privileges and Discipline in the eleventh parliament of Uganda which is chaired by Hon. Abdu Katuntu

Other works 
Sauda donated  Personal Protective Equipments and gas cylinders other to Health workers in Iganga District during the fight against COVID-19 in 2021. She also requested the Government of the republic of Uganda to elevate Iganga general hospital to a referral Hospital Status.

Sauda has always talked against domestic violence in Iganga District. She also requested the president of Uganda Yoweri kaguta Museveni to set up a sugarcane Processing factory in Iganga District to help out the farmers of the Busoga Sub-region and that the president should set up a special fund to help bailing out framers who have gotten loans from the banks amidst the prices of Sugarcanes that were dropping.

See also 

 List of members of the eleventh Parliament of Uganda
 Harriet Businge
 Parliament of Uganda
 National Resistance Movement

References 

Living people
National Resistance Movement politicians
Members of the Parliament of Uganda
Women members of the Parliament of Uganda
21st-century Ugandan politicians
21st-century Ugandan women politicians
Year of birth missing (living people)